The Special Support and Reconnaissance Company, until 1 January 2007 known as the Patrol Company Army Operational Command is the only remaining Long Range Surveillance Company (LRSC) / Long Range Reconnaissance Patrol (LRRP) Coy) in the Danish Armed Forces. The unit is  part of the Danish Home Guard, and the only one of its kind, working directly for the Danish Army and the only unit in Danish Armed Forces that uses a woven fabric for its cap badge.
Like with the other Danish SOFs, the accepted soldiers have one year probation, before they get their beret with the SSR insignia, and can be considered full members.

History
The unit ancestor: the Homeguard Special Intelligence Patrols (SEP) was founded in 1959 during the Cold War. SEP was disbanded in 1994 and Patrol Coy Land Command Zealand was established from the SEP unit in 1995.  The unit was first assigned as a Long Range Reconnaissance Patrol Coy to the Land Command Zealand (Corps-level) and later on the Danish Army Operational Command as Patrol Coy AOC. This unit - Patruljekompagniet - was transformed into the SSR on 1 January 2007 under the Homeguard Command. The unit celebrated the 50 year anniversary of Special Intelligence Patrols on 9 April 2009, as the oldest existing patrol unit of the Danish Homeguard and the only Special Reconnaissance unit of the Danish Homeguard.

Special Intelligence Patrols (SEP) 

The Special Intelligence Patrols (Specielle Efterretningspatruljer or SEP) was founded in 1959 during the early cold war years and was specialised in collecting tactical intelligence behind enemy lines. Originally this was done using static observation sites but later on by insertable intelligence patrols operating behind enemy lines.

The legacy of the Special Intelligence Patrols has not been forgotten and the basic skills (LRS/LRRP) and special reconnaissance capabilities have been maintained and developed within Patruljekompagniet. During the cold war and until the turn of the century SEP - and later Patruljekompagniet - cross-trained with British TA Special Air Service units from 21 SAS (V) (Artists' Rifles) and 23 SAS (V) when they visited Denmark during large scale NATO exercises, as well as US Army Special Forces.

Combat Swimmers 

Patruljekompagniet has the capability to insert patrols covertly from the sea, due to their training with the Danish Frogman Corps, a naval special forces unit. They are trained as combat swimmers and are capable of various kinds of covert surface insertions.

Close protection teams 

In 2006, specially selected soldiers from the SSR, among others, were trained by the Danish Army Special Operations Forces Jægerkorpset as military close protection operators and participated in Danish Army Protection Teams (Protective Services Detail / DA Army PSD) in Iraq.

SSR 

At the beginning of 2007 Patruljekompagniet changed names to Hjemmeværnets Særlig- Støtte og Rekognosceringskompagni (SSR) - the Special- Support and Reconnaissance Coy. Patruljekompagniet was no longer available only to the Danish Army Operational Command (DAOC) but opened to all the Danish Defence Commands e.g. the Danish Navy Operational Command. This marked the end of Patruljekompagniet and the beginning of a new era for this historical specialised unit of volunteer soldiers.

NOTE: Some local homeguard scoutplatoons carry the name of "Patruljekompagni" for historical reasons, but has no patrolling capability beyond scoutplatoon-level and has no LRS-capability. Only SSR - the former Patruljekompagniet to the AOC - can be labeled a "Patruljekompagni" (LRSC/LRRP-COY) in military terms.

References

External links 
 SSR (Hjemmeværnet) - official homepage
 SSR - official recruiting homepage
 Special Support and Reconnaissance - official homepage in English
 The Special Support and Reconnaissance Company Danish Defense website.
 SSR: The Danish Frogman Corps’ extra eyes and ears – and hands! article about supporting the Danish Navy SOF.
 Special Forces are in place article about Danish SOF exercise.
 SSR documents at Issuu - official archive of articles and print about SSR.
 Patruljekompagniet
 YouTube videos about Patruljekompagniet and SSR
 Danish Special Operations Forces and LRS units

Military units and formations of Denmark
Special forces of Denmark
Military units and formations established in 1959
Army reconnaissance units and formations